Sune Kiilerich (born 18 December 1990) is a Danish footballer who plays as a defender for Arendal.

Career
Kiilerich began his career 2004 in the youth from FC Midtjylland and joined  Ikast FS in summer 2009. On 29 January 2010, Sampdoria signed the Danish central defender from FC Midtjylland. The youngster initially became a member of Sampdoria's primavera squad.

International career
Kiilerich played for Denmark national under-20 football team and was formerly a member of the U-18 and U-19.

References

External links
 

1990 births
Living people
People from Ikast-Brande Municipality
Association football defenders
Danish men's footballers
Danish expatriate men's footballers
Viborg FF players
Ikast FS players
U.C. Sampdoria players
Expatriate footballers in Italy
Danish expatriate sportspeople in Italy
Expatriate footballers in Norway
Danish expatriate sportspeople in Norway
Arendal Fotball players
Norwegian First Division players
Denmark youth international footballers
Sportspeople from the Central Denmark Region